Paxtang Park is a current trailhead area in East Harrisburg, Pennsylvania and former  trolley park. It originally existed from 1823 to 1929 between Derry Street and Paxton Street along Spring Creek and has reopened since 2020. The original park contained two roller coasters, the Coaster Flyer and the Jack Rabbit.

History
Paxtang Park was leased to the East Harrisburg Street Electric Railway Company on July 19, 1893, for a ten-year term. Plans included constructing a fence surrounding the property, though the park would remain free entry, a pavilion to hold several hundred people, new shaded areas, benches, and a "gravity railroad" (or scenic railway) for the following season. The gravity railroad was not installed in 1894, nor was it ever operational; it wasn't until 1905 that the park added its first roller coaster - Coaster Flyer. This was a Figure 8 roller coaster and operated from 1905 until 1922. 

In 1922, the railroad company announced they would not renew the lease on the grounds of Paxtang Park for a fourth lease - they had renewed twice before in 1903 and 1913. They were no longer able to afford the costs of operating the park, so they announced 1922 would be the final season of Paxtang Park. However, in August, an amusement company from Newark, New Jersey was able to take control of the lease from the railroad company. They pledged many improvements to the park, which included a new roller coaster and other amusements. 

The park had some success, however by the late 1920s, they were struggling to open the park before the Harrisburg Independence Day Celebration, when it normally would open earlier before Memorial Day, and they were missing tax payments. In 1930, Steelton Bank and Trust took control of the property, and sold off the amusements and other things at a sale, closing the park.

Reopening
Beginning in 2017, the Susquehanna Area Mountain Bike Association (SAMBA) announced plans to restore the park as a parking trailhead and picnic area for cyclists using the Capital Area Greenbelt. Ten miles of trails used for hiking and mountain biking are currently located on the Greenbelt and maintained by SAMBA. It was formally reopened in September 2020.

See also
 Capital Area Greenbelt

References

External links
 DefunctParks.com's Paxtang Park page
 Paxtang Park history at The Amusement Parkives
 Paxtang Park on RCDB.com

Amusement parks in Pennsylvania
1823 establishments in Pennsylvania
1929 disestablishments in Pennsylvania
Defunct amusement parks in Pennsylvania
Parks in Harrisburg, Pennsylvania